RWBY (pronounced "Ruby") is an American anime-influenced computer-animated web series created by Monty Oum for Rooster Teeth. It is set in the fictional world of Remnant, where young people train to become warriors (called "Huntsmen" and "Huntresses") to protect their world from monsters called Grimm. The name RWBY is derived from the four main protagonists' forenames: Ruby Rose, Weiss Schnee, Blake Belladonna, and Yang Xiao Long, and their respective theme colors (red, white, black and yellow).

Following several promotional trailers, the first episode was screened at the Rooster Teeth convention event RTX and then released on their website in July 2013. Subsequent episodes were released approximately weekly, first to Rooster Teeth's subscribers and then to YouTube a week later. Oum died in 2015, during production of the third season for the series. This resulted in a delay in the production, as well as an overall shift in the series production and release schedule. Despite the death of its creator, the remaining crew members confirmed their intention to continue the series. As of December 2022, the website has aired eight volumes. The first of Volume 9's ten chapters was released on Crunchyroll on February 18, 2023.

The first three volumes of RWBY earned acclaim, with praise going towards its animation and soundtrack; it became an instant viral hit after the airing of its pilot. The series has been dubbed in Japanese and broadcast by Tokyo MX, in partnership with Warner Bros. Japan, and has spawned several spin-off media, such as the video games RWBY: Grimm Eclipse and RWBY: Arrowfell and the animated series RWBY Chibi in 2016 and RWBY: Ice Queendom in 2022.

Development

RWBY had been a long-standing concept of Oum's for years before it began development. Towards the end of his work on the 10th season of Rooster Teeth's Red vs. Blue, he developed the color-coding approach to character names and design as a hook for the series. During production on Red vs. Blue season 10, Oum asked series creator Burnie Burns if they could produce RWBY following the conclusion of that season. Burns, worried for the production schedule, told Oum "If you finish Season 10, then you can do whatever you want." Production on RWBY began as intended, with the first trailer being finished within two weeks and premiering after the credits of the Red vs. Blue season 10 finale on November 5, 2012.

Oum designed the characters with assistance from artist Ein Lee, utilizing designs inspired by classic fairy tale characters. Each character has an associated color, and it is the first letters of the main character's colors, red, white, black, and yellow, that give the series its name. The series was originally written by Oum, along with fellow Rooster Teeth employees Miles Luna and Kerry Shawcross. Oum was initially concerned about a story focusing on female characters being developed by a primarily male crew, but said they managed to do well developing the female characters. Regarding the design, Oum wanted to "present a two-dimensional, toon-shaded look, but with all of the depth and complexity of a 3D-animated production". Volumes 1 to 3 were animated by the internal animation team of Rooster Teeth's studios in Austin using Smith Micro's Poser software, out of assets built on Autodesk Maya; however, starting with Volume 4, the production switched to using Maya entirely alongside additional modelling and animation being outsourced to the Monterrey-based studio CGBot. The series' music is composed by Jeff Williams, who previously composed the soundtracks for Seasons 8–10 of Red vs. Blue, and features vocals by Williams' daughter, Casey Lee Williams.

Cast and characters

.

Web series

Synopsis

The story takes place in the fictional world of Remnant, composed of four kingdoms (Vale, Mistral, Atlas, and Vacuo) that are plagued by malevolent creatures known as the "Creatures of Grimm". Prior to the events of the series, the world was overseen by two opposing deities, the God of Light and the God of Darkness. Humanity was obliterated by the gods due to the actions of Salem, a vengeful woman cursed with immortality for trying to manipulate them into reviving her beloved Ozma. Ozma was subsequently reincarnated by the Gods to guide a new human race toward harmony, leading to an endless conflict between him and Salem. Eventually, the discovery of the element Dust triggered a technological and industrial revolution among humans.

In the present day, having formed a cabal to guard their world's secrets, Ozma's current incarnation Ozpin establishes academies in the four kingdoms of Remnant to train students to battle malevolent creatures known as the Grimm. The academies secretly conceal four relics that, if united, would summon the gods back to Remnant to judge humanity. The series focuses on four girls that enrolled in Beacon Academy in the kingdom of Vale: Ruby Rose,  Weiss Schnee,  Blake Belladonna, and  Yang Xiao Long. Together, they form Team RWBY ("ruby")..

In the first volume, Team RWBY and Team JNPR("juniper") (Jaune Arc, Nora Valkyrie, Pyrrha Nikos, and Lie Ren) are introduced.The concept of Aura and Semblances is revealed. During the initiation, Ruby ends up being partnered with Weiss and Blake and Yang are partnered together. Team RWBY is then formed with Ruby as team leader, which causes problems between her and Weiss, but eventually they both promise each other to work hard to become a good leader and teammate. Jaune is revealed to have lied his way into Beacon, which  Cardin Winchester overhears and begins to blackmail him. It is later revealed that Blake is a cat Faunus (a human with animal features) who was a part of the White Fang, and this leads to conflict between Weiss and Blake. Cinder Fall is revealed to be the mastermind behind Torchwick's plans.

In the second volume, the Vytal Festival is coming up, and this leads to other schools arriving at Beacon. Blake becomes stressed about figuring out the White Fang and Torchwick's plans, so much so that she becomes sleep deprived. This causes Yang to confront her by telling her about the time that she nearly got herself and Ruby killed all because she wanted to find her birth mother. Team RWBY then goes on a mission with Professor Oobleck to try and find Torchwick's hideout and are successful, which leads to a fight on a train. In the end students and teachers come together to help fight off the waves of Grimm. General Ironwood is introduced as the headmaster of Atlas Academy as well as the background behind Emerald Sustrai and Mercury Black, two of Cinder's accomplices.

In the third volume the Vytal Festival Tournament takes place which consists of different types of battles. The background behind the Four Maidens is introduced, with Pyrrha being chosen to become the new Fall Maiden. Winter Schnee is introduced as Weiss' older sister and Ironwood's right hand man who helps Weiss practice her summoning. Ruby and Yang's Uncle Qrow arrives at Beacon to warn Ozpin that danger is coming.
While the tournament is proceeding, Cinder along with Emerald, Mercury, and Neopolitan, set their nefarious plans in motion. They manipulate the entire tournament which results in Penny Polendina's death. Cinder plans to use Adam Taurus and the White Fang to help bring Beacon down. This allows for Blake and Adam to meet, which results in Blake getting stabbed and Yang losing her right arm after rushing in to try and save Blake. In the end, Cinder becomes the Fall Maiden and kills Ozpin and Pyrrha, but ultimately falls to Ruby when the latter unleashes a white light that immobilizes her and the Wyvern.

In the fourth volume, Team RWBY is separated from each other, with each being in different parts of the world. Ruby travels to Haven Academy in Mistral with Nora, Jaune, and Ren (" ranger ") (RNJR). Weiss is back home in Atlas, Blake is traveling with  Sun Wukong to her home in Menagerie, and Yang is at her home recovering in Patch. Each person has their own problems and situations that they must handle within their part of the world. Ruby is going to Haven after receiving a tip from her Uncle Qrow about Cinder's whereabouts. Weiss is struggling to be back home with her abusive father. Blake tries to rally people in Menagerie to help fight back against Adam's White Fang, and Yang is struggling from PTSD after the Fall of Beacon. Team RNJR and Qrow end up in a fight against Tyrian Callows one of Salem's subordinates, which results in Qrow getting seriously injured. Qrow then reveals the background regarding the academies and the four relics. In the end, Weiss and Yang decide to leave their homes to go to Mistral. Oscar Pine is introduced as Ozpin's new reincarnation. 

In the fifth volume, Team RNJR and Qrow finally, reach Haven. Weiss gets captured by Raven Branwen's tribe but unexpectedly reunites with Yang, who arrived wanting to get Raven to send her to Ruby. Ruby, Weiss, and Yang reunite, but the latter is still upset about Blake leaving them. Meanwhile, Blake is dealing with her former friend Ilia Amitola and her refusal to leave the White Fang despite knowing how corrupt it is. Leonardo Lionheart, the headmaster of Haven Academy, is revealed to be working with Salem. Raven is harboring the Spring Maiden, so Cinder and Arthur Watts strike a deal with her to get her to open the vault that contains the Relic of Knowledge. During the Battle of Haven, Weiss is impaled by Cinder's spear and Jaune finally unlocks his semblance to heal her. Raven is revealed to be the Spring Maiden and her and Cinder battle it out, which results in Cinder falling off a ledge, presumedly to her death. Raven opens the vault but is confronted by Yang, leading to Raven running away and leaving the relic to Yang. While this is happening Blake and the Faunus from Menagerie arrive at Haven to fight Adam. In the end, Team RWBY is finally reunited.

In the sixth volume, Ozpin tells everyone that they need to head to Atlas to talk to General Ironwood, but on their way, they are separated from Jaune, Nora, and Ren. Ozpin has been keeping secrets from everyone, but they are all revealed when Jinn, the spirit in the Relic of Knowledge, tells them to the group. The history between Ozpin and Salem is shown, and Ozpin ashamed of everything that happened, seals himself in Oscar's mind. Ruby's Group finds an abandoned farm that unbeknownst to them, has a Grimm, called an Apathy, that sucks the will and hope out of everyone. They are saved after Maria Calavera  helps Ruby unlock the power of her silver eyes. The group reunites with JNR in Argus, where they reveal everything that Jinn told them. Due to them being blocked off Caroline Cordovin, Jaune proposes that they steal an airship. The plan works at first, but it gets disrupted when Adam arrives and attacks Blake, but Yang arrives to help. Together they were able to overcome and kill Adam. While this is happening everyone else is fighting Cordovin's Colossus, which they defeat, but right when they try to leave, a Grimm called a Leviathan arrives. Ruby using her new silver-eyed powers, is able to defeat it with the help of Cordovin, who allows them to fly to Atlas.

In the seventh volume, the group successfully arrives at Atlas, but to their shock, it has been completely surrounded by the military. This results in them landing in Mantle where they are able to reunite with Penny, who has been rebuilt. However, they are captured by the Ace-Ops and are taken to Ironwood. There, Ironwood reveals that he plans to tell everyone about Salem by rebuilding a CCT Tower. Ruby decides not to tell Ironwood everything that they learned from Jinn. After going on some missions, Team RWBY and JNR are given their Huntsmen licenses. An election for a seat on the council is occurring and Robyn Hill is running against Jacques Schnee. During a rally, Tyrian murders some people, and Watts is able to force the blame on Penny, and this causes an uproar in Mantle causing tons of Grimm to arrive. Eventually, Blake and Yang tell Robyn about Ironwood's plan and together Robyn and Ironwood tell the citizens everything about Salem. Ironwood then lures Watts out and defeats him in battle, but things take a turn when he discovers someone has infiltrated his office. He lashes out at Team RWBY for not telling the truth and orders the Ace Ops to arrest them. Team RWBY is able to defeat them while Team JNR and Oscar deal with Neopolitan, who has successfully stolen the Relic from them. Cinder then battles against Penny and Winter but flees when Penny becomes the Winter Maiden and Ruby arrives. Oscar tries to talk some sense into Ironwood, but he is shot and falls off the ledge. It ends with Ozpin talking about the concept of fear.  

In the eighth volume, the group is separated when Ruby and Yang disagree on what to do next. Ruby, Weiss, Blake, Nora, and Penny decide to get the CCT Tower running so they can tell the world about Salem, and Yang, Ren, Jaune, and Oscar decide to help evacuate the citizens of Mantle. Oscar is captured and taken to Salem where he is tortured for information about the Lamp of Knowledge Relic, which is now in Salem's hands. Ironwood forces Watts to help him get Penny; Watts does so by uploading a virus into her. Oscar reveals the truth about Salem to Hazel Reinart, which Emerald and Neo overhear. Neo steals the Lamp, and Emerald and Hazel help Oscar escape; Hazel ends up sacrificing his life to help Oscar temporarily kill Salem. The group reunites once again, and they come up with a plan to get the virus out of Penny, which involves using the Staff of Creation Relic. Team RWBY meets Ambrosius, the spirit of the Staff, who is first able to help Penny, and then the citizens by creating a bridge system that can get everyone to Vacuo. However, Cinder uses the Lamp of Knowledge to figure out what Ruby's plan is, and is thus able to intercept Team RWBY. Yang ends up falling into the void after taking a hit meant for Ruby. Cinder then battles Penny and fatally wounds her, causing her to ask Jaune to kill her, allowing her to transfer the Winter Maiden powers to Winter. Cinder also betrays Neo by causing her to fall into the void along with Ruby and Blake. Winter is able to defeat Ironwood with her new powers, but arrives too late as Weiss too falls into the void. Jaune also ends up falling into the void after the bridges start to disappear, after Cinder steals the Staff. In the end Cinder delivers the Lamp of Knowledge and the Staff of Creation to Salem as Atlas falls.

Promotion
A series of four promotional trailers, one for each lead character, was released. They were primarily produced by Oum and assistant animator Shane Newville. Each trailer begins by unveiling one of the four primary characters and then showing a detailed action sequence. The "Red" trailer was shown after the credits for Red vs. Blue's season 10 finale in November 2012. It was followed by the "White" trailer in February 2013. The "Black" trailer was unveiled at a PAX East panel at the end of March and was the first to include voice-acted dialogue. Following the premiere of the "Black" trailer, Oum noted with regret that the first two trailers were shorter and had less character development. The "Yellow" trailer was shown at Rooster Teeth's A-Kon panel on June 1, 2013. Music from the trailers was sold as digital downloads at several online retailers.

On July 5, 2013, at the RWBY panel for their RTX 2013 event, Rooster Teeth premiered the first episode of RWBY, and would post the episode to their website on July 18.

Release
Following the premiere of RWBY in July 2013, Rooster Teeth posted new episodes for the first season, subtitled Volume 1, streaming weekly on their website, with access two hours early for their sponsors. The new episode would be uploaded to YouTube the next week. On August 16, 2013, streaming site Crunchyroll announced it would simulcast RWBY.  Volume 1 ran for 16 episodes, varying in length. Volume 1 concluded in November 2013, and was then released to DVD and Blu-ray.

The second season, subtitled Volume 2, was screened at  RTX on July 4, 2014, and premiered on July 24. It consisted of 12 episodes, with the final episode released on October 30, after which it was released on DVD and Blu-ray.

On February 1, 2015, Rooster Teeth announced that both volumes of RWBY so far were available for streaming on Netflix.

Volume 3 premiered on October 24, 2015, along with an episode of the RWBY backstory series World of Remnant. For Volume 4, Rooster Teeth producer and co-director Gray G. Haddock said that Miles Luna and Kerry Shawcross were writing for the series. The season debuted on October 22, 2016. In January 2017, a fifth season was announced to be in development, and was released on October 14.

In 2017, Rooster Teeth announced that Rooster Teeth First members would get episodes one week earlier than the general public.

On September 15, 2018, Rooster Teeth CEO Matt Hullum announced that RWBY Volume 6 will be released exclusively on the company's website. This decision was made after many of Rooster Teeth's videos on YouTube were demonetized for various reasons. Instead, Volume 6 was released per episode on a weekly basis in YouTube alongside the Volume 7 premiere at Rooster Teeth's website on November 2, 2019. On October 28, 2020, all episodes of RWBY, save the trailers, character shorts, and the first episode, were removed from YouTube in an effort to promote Rooster Teeth's website and mobile, TV, and game console apps. Volume 8 premiered on November 7, 2020, and the series went into a hiatus on December 19 of the same year. Premieres resumed on February 6, 2021.

On January 24, 2023, it was announced that Volume 9 will premiere on February 18 via Crunchyroll as part of a one-year exclusivity deal.

International releases
The Blu-ray and DVD releases in Australia were handled by Hanabee Entertainment. The first volume was released in the UK by Animatsu Entertainment on May 4, 2015, on DVD.

On August 15, 2014, Rooster Teeth announced that a Japanese dub was being developed by Warner Bros. Home Entertainment Japan. Warner Bros. has also acquired local merchandising rights as well. Volume 3 was screened in select theaters on December 3, 2016. Volume 4 was released in select theaters for a limited two-week run from October 7 to 20, 2017. To promote Volume 4, Volumes 1–3 were condensed into 12 episodes for broadcast on Tokyo MX and AbemaTV in July 2017 under the title RWBY 1–3: The Beginning.

Manga and books

RWBY
RWBY has been adapted into a manga series written and illustrated by Shirow Miwa. It has been published in Shueisha's monthly seinen magazine Ultra Jump. The first arc of the manga closely followed the storyline of the four trailers, while subsequent chapters explored original storylines.

The first chapter was released in the Ultra Jump December issue, on November 19, 2015. It had colored center and back pages, along with additional art from the manga.

The English translation was published in Viz Media's Weekly Shonen Jump manga anthology and released for audiences worldwide on October 31, 2016, as previously stated.

Like the series, the RWBY manga follows the members of Team RWBY—Ruby Rose, Weiss Schnee, Blake Belladonna, and Yang Xiao Long—and their adventures as they train to become Huntresses at a prestigious school known as Beacon Academy. The manga delves into the backstories and motivations of the four main characters, giving new insights and context, with appearances from many of the other characters in the main series. The manga also explains some concepts and elements of the setting, such as the Grimm and Dust. The remaining six chapters cover an original story chronologically set between Volumes 1 and 2 involving teams RWBY and JNPR fighting King Taijitu merged by a Grimm that was accidentally let loose as Torchwick investigated a possible entrance to Mountain Glenn.

The final chapter was published in the February 2017 issue of Ultra Jump in January, with a teaser about a second volume.

RWBY: Official Manga Anthology
RWBY: Official Manga Anthology is a manga adaption of RWBY. It consists of side stories that follow the plot of the show, put together by multiple manga artists. It was released in a multi-volume format.

On December 23, 2016, Japanese entertainment company Home-sha announced Vol. 1: Red Like Roses, the first volume of RWBY: Official Manga Anthology and stated it was coming in Spring 2017. It was later announced on March 25, 2017, that it would be released on May 19, 2017. The second volume, Vol. 2: Mirror Mirror, was released on June 19, 2017. The third volume, Vol. 3: From Shadows, was released on September 19, 2017. The fourth volume, Vol. 4: I Burn, was released on October 19, 2017.

In North America, Viz Media has licensed the manga for an English language release.

RWBY: The Official Manga
RWBY: The Official Manga is a manga adaptation written by manga artist Bunta Kinami. The manga debuted on November 19, 2018, in Weekly Shonen Jump, and on December 20, 2018, in Shōnen Jump+. Shueisha published the first tankōbon volume digitally on August 19, 2019. The series manga finished on June 25, 2020.

RWBY: After the Fall
RWBY: After the Fall is the first companion book in a series written by E. C. Myers and published by Scholastic on June 25, 2019. It details the adventures of Team CFVY ("coffee") following the events of the Volume 3 finale, as the team travels to Shade Academy in Vacuo to continue their training and deals with the personal and global aftermath of the Fall of Beacon.

RWBY: Before the Dawn
RWBY: Before The Dawn is a direct sequel to the first companion book After the Fall written by E. C. Myers and released by Scholastic on July 21, 2020. The book takes place sometime after the start of Volume 6, following Team CFVY and Team SSSN ("sun") as they investigate a mysterious organization called The Crown.

The World of RWBY: The Official Companion
The World of RWBY: The Official Companion was published on October 29, 2019, by Viz Media featuring behind the scenes information, interviews and concept art from the show.

RWBY: Fairy Tales of Remnant
RWBY: Fairy Tales of Remnant is a book featuring original fairy tales created for the fictional RWBY universe. It was written by E. C. Myers, illustrated by Violet Tobacco, and published by Scholastic. It was released on September 15, 2020.

RWBY: Roman Holiday
RWBY: Roman Holiday is a novel written by E.C. Myers released on September 7, 2021. The book is a prequel centered on the characters Roman Torchwick and Neopolitan.

Other media

Video games
A hack and slash video game based on the series, RWBY: Grimm Eclipse was developed by Rooster Teeth Games and released on July 5, 2016.

At the Evo 2017 gaming event, it was announced that the fighting game BlazBlue: Cross Tag Battle would feature cross-over characters from BlazBlue, Persona 4 Arena (Ultimax), Under Night In-Birth, and RWBY, followed by Arcana Heart, Senran Kagura and Akatsuki Blitzkampf as of 2019. Ruby Rose was a featured participant in the game's first teaser trailer, and Weiss was confirmed in the second character introduction trailer. Blake and Yang were added as the game's free downloadable content. At Evo 2019, it was announced that Neopolitan (incorrectly referred to as Neo Politan in-game) would be added to the game as part of a 2.0 update scheduled for November 21, 2019.

NHN Entertainment developed a tower defense mobile game based on the show, RWBY: Amity Arena, which was released for Android and iOS devices in October 2018 and shutdown in early 2021. Rooster Teeth Games published two mobile games, also available on Steam, in 2019, the collectible card game RWBY Deckbuilding Game, and the puzzle game RWBY: Crystal Quest. RWBY Deckbuilding Game was discontinued on April 30, 2020.

A new RWBY game published by WayForward and Arc Systems Works titled RWBY: Arrowfell was released on consoles and PC on November 15, 2022.

RWBY Chibi

RWBY Chibi is a comedic animated spin-off of RWBY compromising 57 three- to six-minute-long episodes in three seasons. It was first announced as part of Rooster Teeth's 13th-anniversary celebration on April 1, 2016, and Episode 1 premiered on May 7, 2016. Its first season concluded on October 15, 2016. Each episode consists of several scenes where aspects of RWBY's characters are usually exaggerated for comic effect. The episodes follow no strict chronological order, nor do they follow the strict canon of the main show. In January 2017, Rooster Teeth confirmed that a second season would launch that May. A third season started in January 2018, shortly after the main show's Volume 5 ended. After the series was put on indefinite hiatus, more RWBY Chibi skits were produced as a part of Rooster Teeth's animated anthology series Neon Konbini.

Comics
RWBY (2019): At New York Comic Con 2018, Rooster Teeth announced a partnership with DC Comics to publish RWBY and Gen:Lock comics starting in 2019. The RWBY comic is written by Marguerite Bennett and drawn by Mirka Andolfo and Arif Prianto. The comic was set between the events of Volumes 3 and 4 of the main animated series. The print issue #7 was cancelled, but the print version is later included in the trade paperback release of the RWBY comic in 2020.
RWBY/Justice League (2021): In April 2021, DC announced a Crossover between RWBY and the Justice League. The digital version would start on March 30, 2021, followed by print Issue #1 on April 27, 2021.

CRWBY: Behind the Episode
CRWBY: Behind the Episode is a behind the scenes documentary about the production of RWBY featuring interviews with the production crew. The show aired weekly during Volume 5 and Volume 6. The first season is exclusive for Rooster Teeth FIRST members. The second season is free to watch on YouTube and Rooster Teeth.

RWBY Rewind
RWBY Rewind is a talk show that went live weekly only for FIRST members on Rooster Teeth during the fifth and sixth Volumes. The show featured discussion about the most recent episode and one guest from the production crew. The first season is exclusive for Rooster Teeth FIRST members. The second season is free to watch on YouTube and Rooster Teeth.

Talk CRWBY to Me
Talk CRWBY to Me is a behind the scenes podcast hosted by Kerry Shawcross about the production of RWBY featuring members from the different departments within Rooster Teeth Animation. The podcast started airing weekly only for FIRST members on May 23, 2020, and concluded after eight episodes on July 11, 2020.

RWBY: The Grimm Campaign
RWBY: The Grimm Campaign is a Rooster Teeth FIRST exclusive Dungeons and Dragons campaign featuring Kerry Shawcross as Pyke Rite, Laura Yates as Arrastra Skye, Chad James as Asher Mora and Chris Kokkinos as Fenix Nemean. It premiered on Rooster Teeth FIRST on August 15, 2020. The campaign features an early version of the digital tabletop software TaleSpire with custom models from the RWBY universe.

RWBY: Fairy Tales
RWBY: Fairy Tales is an animated production for Rooster Teeth featuring original fairy tales from the world of Remnant. It was released on October 30, 2021, for FIRST members and for everyone else the next day. The first season concluded on December 4, 2021.

RWBY: Ice Queendom

An anime television series titled  was announced on March 25, 2022. The anime series premiered on July 3, 2022, on Tokyo MX, BS11, and MBS, and is produced by Shaft and directed by Toshimasa Suzuki, with Kenjirou Okada in charge of chief direction, Gen Urobuchi in charge of animation concept, and Tow Ubukata in charge of script; in addition, Huke designed the character concepts, and Nobuhiro Sugiyama designed the characters for animation. Nobuko Toda and Kazuma Jinnouchi are composing the music. The cast for the Japanese dub of the original series are reprising their roles. Void_Chords feat. L performed the opening theme song "Beyond Selves", while Ruby's Japanese voice actress, Saori Hayami, performed the ending theme song "Awake". Crunchyroll will stream the series with both English and Japanese (with English subtitles) audio.

A manga adaptation of RWBY: Ice Queendom illustrated by	Kumiko Suekane launched in ASCII Media Works's shōnen manga magazine Dengeki Daioh on June 27, 2022.

Film
A direct-to-video film, Justice League x RWBY: Super Heroes & Huntsmen, was announced on July 1, 2022. It will be a crossover with characters from DC Comics, produced by Rooster Teeth in collaboration with Warner Bros. Animation and Warner Bros. Home Entertainment. It is scheduled to be made in two parts, with part one released on April 25, 2023.

Appearances in other media
In the film Doctor Sleep, the character Abra Stone has RWBY posters and a statue of the character Emerald Sustrai in her room, and also wears Emerald's hair in a dream sequence. The filmmakers decided to bring in the references suggested by Abra's portrayer Kyliegh Curran, who is a fan of RWBY.

Music

The music for all volumes of RWBY has been composed primarily by Jeff Williams, with additional composition by Steve Goldshein, Mason Lieberman, and Alex Abraham. Williams was a member of the band Trocadero, who did the music for Rooster Teeth's Red vs. Blue, and eventually composed by himself the music for the three seasons of Red vs. Blue that preceded RWBY. Most of the vocals are provided by Williams' daughter Casey Lee Williams, with some additional vocals by Lamar Hall and Sandy Casey.

The soundtrack features a variety of genres, most notably intense, fast-paced rock music. In an interview with Rooster Teeth, Williams mentioned that he uses his lyrics to foreshadow future events on occasion. In developing the songs, Williams uses the show's script and picks out random words and phrases that he thinks are cool. He would also get advanced knowledge as to the character's development, their background stories and lives. He then picks out the emotions related to the scene, adds tempo, drumbeats, rhythm, and eventually composes the song from there.

In December 2022, Williams announced his retirement from music composition, and his daughter Casey would take over as the lead composer for RWBY starting in Volume 9. She is joined by Martin Gonzales, her fellow Ok Goodnight band member.

Reception

Critical response
RWBY has received mostly positive reviews from critics ever since its debut. Commentators discussing the promotional trailers lauded the show's animation style and its musical soundtrack. The trailers prompted enthusiastic anticipation for the series premiere. When the first episode premiered at RTX, it was popular with attendees to the point that seating was full at all three screenings. Amanda Rush, writing for Crunchyroll, noted the anime and Western influences of the series, and praised it as "quick-witted, exciting, lovely to look at" saying fans of anime would enjoy it. The Yakima Herald-Republic called it "thrilling" and "captivating" and praised its "beautiful" 3D character animation. The Austin Chronicle described the premiere as making Oum the "rock star" of Rooster Teeth. By mid-2013, the series had reportedly contributed to a 9% increase in views for Rooster Teeth's official YouTube channel. Kotaku'''s Richard Eisenbeis praised the series for its clever use of fairytale elements, fun and enjoyable dialogue, and the fighting choreography, but was critical about the short nature of the episodes, stating that, "The biggest drawback in doing a micro-series ... is that there is precious little time for good characterization". He was also critical of the technical issues of the animation, mentioning that the animation is good when the audience is unable to see the character's feet. He believes that RWBY is "a good first step into a world of possibilities."

Rachel Sandell of Collider recommended watching each season as a feature-length film, and argued the pacing the series has "always been a strange experience". She also said the pacing of early seasons "seems strange" and argued that the series took a "long time" to solidify its plot, but stated that more recent episodes are "more consistent" in their structure, and said the series is "engrossing, charming, and fun". Ruth Johnson of ComicsBeat argued that the series has expanded so much over its run since Season 1 that it can be "hard to keep track of all the storylines", but praised the voice acting, animation, and writers, and said that show is "consistently...growing stronger." Eric Francisco of Inverse described the series as "beautiful" and "captivating". Anime News Network reviewer Michael Basile reflected on the series eight volumes, concluding that the plot structure, writing, and pacing has changed since the beginning of the series, praising the writing of General Ironwood and the show's seventh volume, but criticizing the writing, "lack of creativity" in fight scenes, the show's tone, and called Volume 8 "nasty and mean-spirited". He also expressed the belief that the show's ninth volume would give the series a "directional reset" and said that he hoped the writing would improve.

Associations with anime

Lindsay Jones (Ruby Rose) said "We were worried about the reception we’d get, since we’re a western company producing something normally related to Japan. Funnily enough, we showed our Japanese cohorts RWBY and they started arguing about whether it was anime or not! But seeing the reception from audiences is so surreal, and we never expected it." A Movie Pilot blog listed the RWBY-as-anime topic among its "flame wars you don't want to be part of". Anime News Network writers Paul Jensen and James Beckett wrote: "We don't have any formal reviews of RWBY here on ANN, but it is kind of cool to see an American production make it to the release encyclopedia." Michael Mauer of The Cornell Daily Sun wrote that the issue was still being debated among the anime community, while Sabrina Pyun of ComicsVerse wrote "The show is known for many things, from its dubious status as an anime to its unique 3D animation style." However, mainstream news articles dated after Hullum's statement and previewing later seasons and the franchise have referred to RWBY as an American anime, including Variety, Collider, iDigitalTimes, Entertainment Weekly, Adweek, and Deadline Hollywood''.

Awards and nominations

References

External links
 
 
 
 
 

 
2013 web series debuts
2010s American adult animated television series
2010s American LGBT-related drama television series
American adult animated web series
American adult animated action television series
American adult animated adventure television series
American adult animated fantasy television series
American adult animated science fiction television series
American animated science fantasy television series
LGBT-related animated web series
Anime-influenced Western animated television series
Television about magic
Fiction about monsters
Rooster Teeth franchises
Schools in fiction
Seinen manga
Shōnen manga
Streamy Award-winning channels, series or shows
Television series by Otter Media
Shueisha franchises
Shueisha manga